Miguel A. Loíz Zayas is a Puerto Rican politician from the New Progressive Party (PNP). He served as member of the 20th Senate of Puerto Rico from 1993 to 1997.

Earned a Bachelor of Arts in Social Science. In addition to a master's degree in elementary school English from the University of Puerto Rico. Worked as a teacher in many schools in Las Piedras, Puerto Rico until retirement in 1989 after 30 years of service at Ramón Power y Giralt High School in Las Piedras.

Loíz was elected to the Senate of Puerto Rico in the 1992 general election. He represented the District of Humacao, along with Luis Felipe Navas.

See also
20th Senate of Puerto Rico

References

1934 births
Living people
Members of the Senate of Puerto Rico
People from San Lorenzo, Puerto Rico
New Progressive Party (Puerto Rico) politicians
Puerto Rican educators
United States Army soldiers
University of Puerto Rico alumni